Puss in Boots: The Three Diablos is a 2012 American computer-animated short adventure 
comedy film. It was directed by Raman Hui and features Antonio Banderas as the voice of the title character. The short was released on February 24, 2012, attached as a bonus feature to the Puss in Boots DVD and Blu-ray (3D) release. The short tells a story of Puss in Boots on a mission to recover a princess' stolen ruby from the notorious French thief the Whisperer. Reluctantly accompanied by three cute little kittens called the Three Diablos, Puss must tame them before they endanger the mission.

Plot
Some time after the Golden Goose incident, Puss in Boots is riding his horse through the desert contemplating the crossroads he found himself at -outlaw or hero?- when he is captured by Italian knights. He is then taken to Princess Alessandra Belagomba, whose "Heart of Fire" Ruby, the crown jewel of her kingdom, is missing. At first, Puss believes he is being wrongfully charged for the theft, but it later turns out that the Princess only wants to hire him based on his reputation, revealing that a French thief called "The Whisperer" was the one who committed the crime and that the Princess' knights have captured his three henchmen. The henchmen turn out to be three kittens, whom the princess refers to as "Diablos". Though Puss cannot believe that such innocent creatures could be thieves, the princess and her guards are terrified of them. The Diablos agree to help Puss on the premise that they will be free if they return the ruby.

When Puss takes the Diablos to the desert, they quickly turn on him (revealing their backstabbing nature) and bury him alive. Puss later escapes and recaptures the Diablos using his wide eyes against theirs. That night, he talks about sending them back to jail for double-crossing him, but he learns that they have no family and are orphans like him. He then sympathetically tells them how he also knows it's tough growing up not knowing whom to trust and being betrayed, making an example of how Humpty led him down the wrong path, just as the Whisperer has done to them. Puss then decides to point the Diablos in the right direction and trains them how to fight and plays with them, becoming friends. He also gives them names: Perla (because she is one of a kind), another Gonzalo (for his scrappy temper) and the other Sir Timoteo Montenegro the Third (a title is all he needs).

The next day, the Diablos, turning over a new leaf, show Puss to the Whisperer's secret hideout, and are immediately confronted by the Whisperer himself, who, by his name, has a low voice volume and uses his hat as a megaphone to speak clearly. It is also revealed that the Whisperer himself has used the heart as a decoration for his own belt. After learning that the Diablos brought Puss to him to recover the heart, the Whisperer is about to punish them for their betrayal, but Puss fights him and lets the Diablos escape. They, however, return to help Puss with what they learned from him and the Whisperer falls into a bottomless pit, Puss reclaiming the heart in the process. Puss then returns the heart to the Princess and is rewarded with gold, and he gives the Princess the Diablos as her new personal bodyguards. They then say their goodbyes and Puss claims "He will never forget them, just as he is sure they will never forget the name of Puss in-"; unfortunately, the guards slam the doors before he can finish his goodbye.

Voice cast
 Antonio Banderas as Puss in Boots
 Gilles Marini as Captain of the Guard / Paolo the Squire
 Charlotte Newhouse as Princess Alessandra Bellagamba
 Chris Miller as Food Prisoner
 Walt Dohrn as Water Prisoner
 Bret Marnell as Toilet Paper Prisoner
 Miles Christopher Bakshi as Gonzalo / Sir Timoteo Montenegro the Third
 Nina Zoe Bakshi as Perla
 Guillaume Aretos as Le Chuchoteur - the Whisperer

Release

Home media
The short film was released with Puss in Boots on February 24, 2012.

Reception
Bret Marnell was nominated for Outstanding Achievement, Editorial in an Animated Television or other Broadcast Venue Production for his work on Puss in Boots: Three Diablos at the 40th Annual Annie Awards.

References

External links

 
 

2012 films
2012 computer-animated films
2010s American animated films
2010s animated short films
2012 comedy films
American parody films
Fairy tale parody films
American animated short films
American comedy short films
American sequel films
Computer-animated short films
Films scored by Henry Jackman
Films scored by Matthew Margeson
Films based on Puss in Boots
Films directed by Raman Hui
Shrek films
DreamWorks Animation animated short films
Animated films about cats
2010s English-language films